The Royal and Merciful Society of Bearers of Medals and Awards of Belgium (Koninklijke en Menslievende Vereniging van Dragers van Eretekens en Medailles van Belgie) was founded in 1865. The headquarters of the Royal Society is located in Heule, Belgium.

Patronage 
The Royal Society is under the protection of the King of the Belgians.

  Royal Protector: Philippe - King of the Belgians.

Members 
The Royal and Merciful Society of the Bearer of Medals and Awards of Belgium elects as members, persons who were honoured for their acts of either courage, self-sacrifice or charity.

Members must have an excellent reputation and their awards for the above acts must be, by the Belgian State or any other State which has been recognized by the Belgian State.

Moreover, there are associate members that support the objectives of the Royal Association.

Structure 

The Royal and Merciful Society of the Bearer of Medals and Awards of Belgium is governed by a national board of directors. At the top is the protector, Philippe - King of the Belgians. The Honorary Chairman is the Mayor of Brussels. The Society is made up of the Belgian provinces and the external Regions.

Provinces 
  Kingdom of Belgium:
 Province Brabant
 Province East Flanders
 Province West Flanders
 Province Hainaut
 Province Namur
 Province Liège
 Province Limburg

External Regions 
  Region of Germany
  Region of France
  Region of the Netherlands

Medals and awards 
The Royal and Merciful Society of the Bearer of Medals and Awards of Belgium gives two kinds of awards: The Order of the Belgian Cross (Orde van het belgisch Kruis) and Medals of Gratitude (Erkentelijkheidmedailles). An Honorary Cross for humanitarian merit is also awarded.

Honorary Cross 

  Honorary Cross, Awarded for outstanding humanitarian work and merit.

Order of the Belgian Cross 

The Order is awarded in five classes which are, in descending order of precedence:
 Grand Cross (GKBK)
 Grand Officer (GOBK)
 Commander (CBK)
 Officer (OBK)
 Knight (RBK)

The Order is exclusively reserved for full members and is awarded for outstanding social achievements.

Medals of Gratitude 
There are two kinds of Medals of Gratitude: The "Palms of Mercy" (Palmen van Menslievenheid) and the  "Medal of the Belgian Crown" (Medal van Gekroont Belgie).

Palms of Mercy 
There are the following classes:
 Gold Medal
 Silver Medal
 Bronze Medal

Medal of the Belgian Crown 
There are the following classes:
 Gold Medal
 Silver Medal
 Bronze Medal

Publications 
The Royal Society publishes the following journal:

  DE PHILANTHROPIST 

It appears on a quarterly basis.

See also 
 List of Belgian monarchs
 Presidents of the Royal and Merciful Society of the Bearer of Medals and Awards of Belgium

External links 
 Official Website - Royal and Merciful Society of the Bearer of Medals and Awards of Belgium

References 

Belgian nobility
Orders, decorations, and medals of Belgium